Duke of Newcastle upon Tyne was a title that was created three times, once in the Peerage of England and twice in the Peerage of Great Britain. The first grant of the title was made in 1665 to William Cavendish, 1st Marquess of Newcastle upon Tyne. He was a prominent Royalist commander during the Civil War.

The related title of Duke of Newcastle-under-Lyne was created once in the Peerage of Great Britain. It was conferred in 1756 on Thomas Pelham-Holles, 1st Duke of Newcastle upon Tyne (of the third creation), to provide a slightly more remote special remainder. The title became extinct in 1988, a year that saw the deaths of the distantly related ninth and tenth Dukes of Newcastle-under-Lyne.

Creations

First creation (1665) 
William Cavendish, 1st Duke of Newcastle, was a son of Charles Cavendish, himself the third son of Sir William Cavendish and his wife Bess of Hardwick. One of Charles Cavendish's elder brothers became the 1st Earl of Devonshire (see Duke of Devonshire for further history about this branch of the family).

The first duke, William Cavendish, was the son of Charles Cavendish and his second wife Catherine Ogle, 8th Baroness Ogle, daughter of Cuthbert Ogle, 7th Baron Ogle. William Cavendish became Viscount Mansfield in 1620, and in 1621, he was created Earl of Newcastle upon Tyne and Baron Cavendish of Bolsover. He succeeded his mother as ninth Baron Ogle in 1629, and he became Marquess of Newcastle upon Tyne in 1643. He was elevated to the dukedom of Newcastle upon Tyne in 1665. He also was granted the title of Earl of Ogle as a subsidiary title for the dukedom, to be used as a courtesy title by his heir apparent. Upon his death in 1676, he was succeeded by his son, the second Duke, who was a politician. However, the second Duke's only son and heir apparent (Henry Cavendish, Earl of Ogle) predeceased him. Therefore, upon the second Duke's death in 1691, all of these many titles became extinct, except the barony of Ogle, which fell into abeyance between the second duke's four daughters (one of whom was Lady Elizabeth Cavendish).

Second creation (1694) 
The second Duke's third daughter, Lady Margaret Cavendish (1661-1717), married John Holles, 4th Earl of Clare, who was incidentally her first cousin, her mother's sister's son. In 1694, the dukedom was revived when he was created Marquess of Clare and Duke of Newcastle upon Tyne. The Holles family descended from John Holles, who was created Baron Haughton, of Haughton in Nottinghamshire, in 1616 and Earl of Clare in 1624. His second son was a politician, Denzil Holles, 1st Baron Holles. Lord Clare was succeeded by his eldest son, the second Earl. He represented East Retford, Nottinghamshire, in the House of Commons and served as Lord Lieutenant of Nottinghamshire. His son, the third Earl, was briefly MP for Nottinghamshire in 1660. He was succeeded by his son, the aforementioned fourth Earl of Clare, who married a daughter of the second Duke of Newcastle. In 1694, three years after the title became extinct, the Dukedom of Newcastle was revived and granted to the late Duke's son-in-law. The new duke of Newcastle and his wife, Lady Margaret, had only one daughter and no sons. Therefore, on his death in 1711, all his titles became extinct.

Third creation (1715) and Newcastle-under-Lyne (1756) 

The Duke's sister, Lady Grace Holles (died 1700), married Thomas Pelham, 1st Baron Pelham (see Earl of Chichester for earlier history of the Pelham family). Their elder son Thomas, upon his uncle's death in 1711, succeeded to the substantial Holles estates and assumed by Royal Licence the additional surname and arms of Holles. In 1714, the earldom of Clare was revived when he was created Viscount Haughton and Earl of Clare, with remainder to his younger brother Henry Pelham. The following year, the dukedom was revived when he was made Marquess of Clare and Duke of Newcastle upon Tyne, with like special remainder. These titles were in the Peerage of Great Britain. In 1756, when his brother died without male issue and it was evident that the Duke would have no children, the Duke of Newcastle upon Tyne was additionally created Duke of Newcastle-under-Lyne with a different special remainder: to his nephew-by-marriage Henry Clinton, 9th Earl of Lincoln, who rapidly took on the additional surname Pelham. (For the history of this title from the 1768 inheritance upon the 1st Duke's death, see Earl of Lincoln.) The 1st Duke's other titles became extinct, except for the Pelham baronetcy (of Laughton) and the barony of Pelham (of Stanmer), which devolved to his first cousin once-removed, Thomas Pelham. (For the history of these titles, see Earl of Chichester.)

Extensive personal, transaction and estate papers of the dukes are held in the Portland (Welbeck) and Newcastle (Clumber) collections at the University of Nottingham's Department of Manuscripts and Special Collections.

Dukes of Newcastle upon Tyne, first creation (1665)
also Marquess of Newcastle upon Tyne (1643), Earl of Newcastle upon Tyne (1628), Viscount Mansfield (1620) and Baron Ogle (1461)
 William Cavendish, 1st Duke of Newcastle (1592–1676) was a Cavalier commander in the English Civil War
 Henry Cavendish, 2nd Duke of Newcastle (1630–1691), only surviving son of the 1st Duke, died without surviving male issue
 daughter married 4th Earl of Clare (see below)

Earls of Clare (1624)
also Baron Haughton (1616)
 John Holles, 1st Earl of Clare (1564–1637) was Comptroller of the Household to Henry Frederick, Prince of Wales
 John Holles, 2nd Earl of Clare (1595–1666), eldest son of the 1st Earl
 Gilbert Holles, 3rd Earl of Clare (1633–1689), second (eldest adult) son of the 2nd Earl
 John Holles, 4th Earl of Clare (1662–1711), eldest son of the 3rd Earl. Created Duke in 1694 (see section below)
 married Lady Margaret Cavendish, daughter of Henry Cavendish, 2nd Duke of the first creation

Dukes of Newcastle upon Tyne, second creation (1694)
also Earl of Clare (1624) and Baron Haughton (1616)
 John Holles, Duke of Newcastle (1662–1711) died without male issue, and his titles became extinct

Dukes of Newcastle upon Tyne, third creation (1715)
also Earl of Clare (1714), Baron Pelham of Laughton (1706), Baron Pelham of Stanmer (1762) and Pelham Baronet, of Laughton (1611)
 Thomas Pelham-Holles, 1st Duke of Newcastle (1693–1768), Prime Minister twice, a nephew of John Holles (above). He died without male issue. At this point his father's baronetcy and barony of 1706, his own earldom and earlier dukedom of 1715 became extinct.

Dukes of Newcastle-under-Lyne (1756)
1st Duke: also Duke of Newcastle-upon-Tyne (1715), Earl of Clare (1714), Baron Pelham of Laughton (1706), Baron Pelham of Stanmer (1762) and Pelham Baronet, of Laughton (1611)
 Thomas Pelham-Holles, 1st Duke of Newcastle (1693–1768) (above) was granted this second Newcastle dukedom, with remainder to his nephew
 Henry Fiennes Pelham-Clinton, 9th Earl of Lincoln, 2nd Duke of Newcastle-under-Lyne (1720–1794), nephew of the 1st Duke
 George Pelham-Clinton, Lord Clinton (1745–1752), eldest son of the 2nd Duke, died young
 Henry Fiennes Pelham-Clinton, Earl of Lincoln (1750–1778), second son of the 2nd Duke
 Henry Pelham-Clinton, Earl of Lincoln (1777–1779; styled Lord Clinton until 1778), only son of Lord Lincoln, died young
 Thomas Pelham-Clinton, 3rd Duke of Newcastle-under-Lyne (1752–1795), third son of the 2nd Duke
 Henry Pelham Fiennes Pelham-Clinton, 4th Duke of Newcastle-under-Lyne (1785–1851), eldest son of the 3rd Duke
 Henry Pelham Pelham-Clinton, 5th Duke of Newcastle-under-Lyne (1811–1864), eldest son of the 4th Duke
 Henry Pelham Alexander Pelham-Clinton, 6th Duke of Newcastle-under-Lyne (1834–1879), eldest son of the 5th Duke
 Henry Pelham Archibald Douglas Pelham-Clinton, 7th Duke of Newcastle-under-Lyne (1864–1928), eldest son of the 6th Duke, died without issue
 Henry Francis Hope Pelham-Clinton-Hope, 8th Duke of Newcastle-under-Lyne (1866–1941), second and youngest son of the 6th Duke
 Henry Edward Hugh Pelham-Clinton-Hope, 9th Duke of Newcastle-under-Lyne (1907–1988), only son of the 8th Duke, died without male issue
 Edward Charles Pelham-Clinton, 10th Duke of Newcastle-under-Lyne (1920–1988), great-grandson of Lord Charles Pelham Pelham-Clinton, second son of the 4th Duke. On his death also in 1988 the dukedom ceased to have patrilineal heirs so became extinct.

see also Earl of Lincoln

Principal seats and abodes

England

 Clumber Park, also known as Clumber Park Lodge, spanning Clumber and Worksop, Nottinghamshire, from 1709 until 1938, when the house was demolished.
 Boyton Manor, Wiltshire, bought in the 1950s and sold about 1980.
 Newcastle House, Lincoln's Inn Fields, London, briefly in the 18th century.
 Claremont, Esher, north Surrey, from 1714 to 1768.
 A house on part of the site of the dismantled Nottingham Castle, which was on the rejection of "the Reform Bill" by the Lords set on fire by a mob, at which time it had for many years been divided into separate dwellings.
 The 6th Duke inherited the Hope mansion of Deepdene House, Dorking, Surrey, which was sold by the 8th Duke.

Wales

 One duke bought the retreat of Cwm Elain, Dyfryn-Elain, Cwm-Toyddwr, Radnorshire, from Sir Robert Peel. It had been sold off by 1849.
 The heirs of Thomas Johnes (died 1816) sold Hafod Uchtryd, in Cardiganshire, together with its estate on the Ystwith, to the 4th Duke. The process of sale took from 1831 until 1833, and the price was £70,000. The Duke spent £20,000 on the property, including adding the Havod Arms Inn, four miles from the house in Llanfihangel y Creuddyn. In 1846, he sold the estate for £95,000 to Henry Hoghton.

Ireland
 The 6th Duke inherited the Hope mansion of Castleblayney, County Monaghan, Ireland; this was sold by the 8th Duke.

Family tree

Other notable descendants (last creation)
 Camilla Long is a grand-daughter of Marjorie Pelham-Clinton (1910–2005), a first cousin of the 10th Duke and a great-granddaughter of the 4th Duke.

See also
 Duke of Devonshire
 Earl of Portland, which inherited most of the dukedom's estates from 2nd Duke of Portland
 Cavendish-Bentinck
 Duchess of Newcastle (disambiguation)
 Earl of Chichester
 Earl of Lincoln
 Earl of Newcastle
 Baron Clinton
 Baron Holles
 Baron Ogle

References

Extinct dukedoms in the Peerage of England
Extinct dukedoms in the Peerage of Great Britain
Cavendish family
Pelham family
Clinton family (English aristocracy)
Peerages created with special remainders
Noble titles created in 1665
Noble titles created in 1694
Noble titles created in 1715
Noble titles created in 1756